The 1979 UCLA Bruins football team represented the University of California, Los Angeles during the 1979 NCAA Division I-A football season. This was Terry Donahue's fourth season as the Bruins' head coach.

–

Schedule

Roster

Awards and honors
 All-American: Kenny Easley (S, consensus), Freeman McNeil (TB, third team)

References

External links
 Game program: UCLA at Washington State – October 13, 1979

UCLA
UCLA Bruins football seasons
UCLA Bruins football
UCLA Bruins football